Athletics events at the 2006 South American Games were held at the Centro Nacional de Alto Rendimiento Deportivo in Buenos Aires, Argentina, between November 10–12, 2006.

This year, participation was restricted to athletes younger than 23
years.  The competition also served as the 2nd South American Under-23 Championships.  A detailed report on the results was given.

A total of 44 events were contested, 22 by men and 22 by women.

Participation
410 athletes from 11 countries (all CONSUDATLE members except Panamá and
Suriname) were reported to participate at the South American Under-23
Championships.  However, an unofficial count through the result lists resulted only in 266 participating athletes:

 (55)
 (6)
 (65)
 (35)
 (35)
 (17)
 (1)
 (9)
 (11)
 (6)
 (26)

There is no hint on participation of
athletes from Aruba and Netherlands Antilles (ODESUR members, but not CONSUDATLE members).

Medal summary

Medal winners for the South American Games were published in a book by written Argentinian journalist Ernesto Rodríguez III with support of the Argentine Olympic Committee (Spanish: Comité Olímpico Argentino) under the auspices of the Ministry of Education (Spanish: Ministerio de Educación de la Nación) in collaboration with the Office of Sports (Spanish: Secretaría de Deporte de la Nación).  Eduardo Biscayart supplied the list of winners and their results.

Medal winners for the South American Under-23 Championships as well as detailed results were also published.

There is no indication for a cancellation of certain events or awarding a reduced number of medals because of an insufficient participation for this year's South American Games as in the years before.  Therefore, the results are identical to the
South American Under-23 Championships.

Medal table (unofficial)
The unofficial medal count is identical to the medal count of the South American Under-23 Championships, and is shown elsewhere .

References

2006
International athletics competitions hosted by Argentina
South American Games
2006 South American Games events